Lucrezia Galletta (1520s - 1580), was an Italian courtesan and banker.  

Lucrezia Galletta was active as a celebrated courtesan in Rome. She was able to retire with a fortune in 1559, had herself erased from the list of courtesans and engaged in business as a banker. She was a substantial banker with international clients. She was the only female banker who, alongside several Cardinals and members of the noblefamilies of Rome, co-signed the "grand parti de Lyon" on 18 January 1560, in which the king of France was granted a large credit.

References 

16th-century Italian businesswomen
Italian courtesans
1580 deaths
Renaissance women
Italian bankers
Italian female prostitutes
Women bankers